Bostanite is a former village in the municipality of Chuprene, in Vidin Province, in northwestern Bulgaria.

Population
According to the 2011 census, the village of Bostanite has 0 inhabitants, down from 1 inhabitant during the 2001 census. The last inhabitant died in 2004.

References

Villages in Vidin Province